Can't Sell Dope Forever is a collaboration studio album between hip hop groups dead prez and Outlawz. The album was released on Affluent Records July 25, 2006, and executive produced by Oscar Sanchez. Stic.man and M-1 of dead prez are most known for their revolutionary musical content, and E.D.I., Young Noble and Kastro of Outlawz are most known from their close affiliation with late Hip Hop superstar 2Pac.

Track listing

External links 
 
 
 

2006 albums
Albums produced by E.D.I.
Dead Prez albums
Outlawz albums